Bugbane is a common name for several plants and may refer to:

Actaea
Trautvetteria